Papetōai is an associated commune on the island of Moorea, in French Polynesia. It is part of the commune Moorea-Maiao. According to the 2017 census, it had grown to a population 2,329 people.

Geography

Climate

Papetōai has a tropical rainforest climate (Köppen climate classification Af).

References

Populated places in the Society Islands
Mo'orea